Bill Craig (28 February 1930 – 19 July 2002) was a Scottish television scriptwriter.

He wrote many programmes, including the TV adaptations of The Vital Spark, Sunset Song, Cloud Howe, Grey Granite and The Eagle of the Ninth. He wrote the 1969 BBC thriller Scobie in September.

He also wrote for the BBC's Compact soap opera and The Borderers with Iain Cuthbertson as the warden.

References

External links

1930 births
2002 deaths
Scottish writers